Macallan may refer to:

People

 Andrew MacAllan, pseudonym of James Leasor (1923–2007), British author
 Jes Macallan, stage name of Jessica Lee Liszewski (born 1982), American actress.
 Macculind (died c. 497), an early Irish saint who was abbot or bishop of Lusk.

Other

 The Macallan distillery, a single malt Scotch whisky distillery in Craigellachie, Moray, Scotland